The Gayrabetov Mansion is a building in Rostov-on-Don, located on Liberty Square. The house was built in 1880. Initially it belonged to the relatives of merchant Karp Gayrabetov. At the beginning of the 20th century, the building was acquired by the manufacturer Mark Iskidarov. Since 2011, the  has been located in the mansion. The Gayrabetov Mansion has the status of an object of cultural heritage of regional significance.

History 
The mansion was built in 1880 at the expense of the heirs of merchant Karp Gayrabetov in the city of Nakhichevan-on-Don (now part of the Proletarsky District of Rostov-on-Don). At the beginning of the 20th century, the mansion was acquired by the manufacturer and director of the Nakhichevan City Public Bank, Mark Iskidarov, who reconstructed the building.

In 1920 the building was nationalized. For a time it housed the "Vrubel" Nakhichevan Art School, founded by the writer Marietta Shaginyan and her sister Magdalina. At the end of the 1920s, the ground floor of the mansion housed the Pushkin City Library, and the upper floor housed the Pioneer Club. During the Great Patriotic War, the roof of the building and the facade were partially damaged. In 1947, the building was transferred to the library. In the 1950s, a large balcony-canopy covering the entire width of the sidewalk at the main entrance was dismantled. By the end of the 2000s, the building was in poor condition and needed repair.

In 2007, the Holy Cross Church was returned to the Armenian Apostolic Church. The Museum of Russian-Armenian Friendship, which had previously occupied the church building, was moved to the Gayrabetov Mansion. Renovations to the mansion took place, and were completed in 2011.

Architecture and design 
The two-story brick mansion has an L-shaped configuration in plan. Different styles are combined in the architecture and design of the building's facades. The marble decoration, reinforced concrete structures, and large windows on the ground floor are typical of Art Nouveau. The complex rhythmic structure of the facade is characteristic of classicism.

The recessed facades are completed by entablatures and attics. The north corner of the mansion was originally accented by a dome (now lost). The central part of the facade overlooking Liberty Square is decorated with a bay window. Window openings on the second floor have semicircular ends. Above the entrance there is a large balcony on open-work molded racks. The facade is decorated with pilasters of the Ionic order, stucco molding and decorative plaster.

References 

Tourist attractions in Rostov-on-Don
Buildings and structures in Rostov-on-Don
Cultural heritage monuments in Rostov-on-Don
Houses completed in 1880
Art Nouveau architecture in Russia
Cultural heritage monuments of regional significance in Rostov Oblast